New Christian was a socio-religious designation and legal distinction in the Spanish Empire and the Portuguese Empire. The term was used from the 15th century onwards primarily to describe the descendants of the Sephardic Jews and Moors baptised into the Catholic Church following the Alhambra Decree. The Alhambra Decree of 1492, also known as the Edict of Expulsion, was an anti-Jewish law made by the Catholic Monarchs upon the Reconquista of the Iberian Peninsula. It required Jews to convert to Catholicism or be expelled from Spain. Most of the history of the "New Christians" refers to the Jewish converts, who were generally known as Conversos (or in a more derogatory fashion Marranos) while the Muslim converts were known as Moriscos.

Because the conversions were achieved in part through coercion and also with the threat of expulsion, especially when it came to the Jews, the Inquisitions and Iberian monarchs suspected a number of the "New Christians" of  being Crypto-Jews. Subsequently, the Spanish Inquisition and then the Portuguese Inquisition was created to enforce Catholic orthodoxy and to investigate allegations of heresy. This became a political issue in Spain and Portugal itself and their respective empires abroad, particularly in Spanish America, Portuguese America, and the Caribbean. Sometimes "New Christians" travelled to territories controlled by Protestant enemies of Spain, such as the Dutch Empire, the early English Empire, or Huguenot-influenced areas of France such as Bordeaux, and openly practiced Judaism, which furthered suspicion of Jewish crypsis. Nevertheless, a significant number of those "New Christians" who had conversos as ancestors, were deemed by Spanish society as sincerely Catholic still managed to attain prominence, whether religious (St. John of the Cross, St. Teresa of Ávila, St. John of Ávila, St. Joseph of Anchieta, Tomás de Torquemada, Diego Laynez, Francisco de Vitoria, Francisco Suárez and others) or political (Juan de Oñate, Luis de Carvajal y de la Cueva, Hernán Pérez de Quesada, Luis de Santángel and others).

According to António José Saraiva, a famous or "Emeritus" Portuguese literature teacher and historian, "The reality of the dichotomy between Old and New Christian only existed in the Inquisitorial taxonomy. The religious or ethnic definition of the New Christians was, in the last analysis, merely formal and bureaucratic. Also, the label of the New Christian can be based on rumors originating from dubious genealogies, slander and intrigue." By law, the category of New Christians included recent converts and their known baptized descendants with any fraction New Christian blood up to the third generation, the fourth generation being exempted. In Phillip II's reign, it included any person with any fraction of New Christian blood "from time immemorial". In Portugal, in 1772, Sebastião José de Carvalho e Melo, 1st Marquess of Pombal decreed an end to the legal distinction between New Christians and Old Christians.

New Christian as a legal category
Although the category of New Christian is meaningless in Christian theology and ecclesiology, it was introduced by the Old Christians who claimed "pure unmixed" Christian bloodlines to distinguish themselves as a unique group, separated from ethnic Jews and Iberian Muslims.

The Old Christians wanted to legally and socially distinguish themselves from the conversos (converts to Christianity) who they considered being tainted by their non-Spanish bloodlines-even though the overwhelming majority of Spain's Muslims were also of indigenous Iberian stock, descendants of native Iberians who earlier converted to Islam under Muslim rule.

In practice, for New Christians of Jewish origin, the concept of New Christian was a legal mechanism and manifestation of racial antisemitism rather than Judaism as a religion. For those of Moorish origin, it was a manifestation of racial anti-Berberism and/or anti-Arabism.

Cleanliness of blood and related concepts

The related Spanish development of an ideology of limpieza de sangre ("cleanliness of blood") also excluded New Christians from society — universities, emigration to the New World, many professions — regardless of their sincerity as converts.

Other derogatory terms applied to each of the converting groups included marranos (i.e. "pigs") for New Christians of Jewish origin, and moriscos (a term which carried pejorative connotations) for New Christians of Andalusian origin.

Discrimination and persecution
Aside from social stigma and ostracism, the consequences of legal or social categorization as a New Christian included restrictions of civil and political rights, abuses of those already-limited civil rights, social and sometimes legal restrictions on whom one could marry (anti-miscegenation laws), social restrictions on where one could live, legal restrictions of entry into the professions and the clergy, legal restrictions and prohibition of immigration to and settlement in the newly colonized Spanish territories in the Americas, deportation from the colonies.

In addition to the above restrictions and discrimination endured by New Christians, the Spanish Crown and Church authorities also subjected New Christians to persecution, prosecution, and capital punishment for actual or alleged practice of the family's former religion.

After the Alhambra Decree of the expulsion of the Jewish population from Spain in 1492 and a similar Portuguese decree in 1497, the remaining Jewish population in Iberia became officially Christian by default. The New Christians, especially those of Jewish origin, were always under suspicion of being judaizantes ("judaizers"), that is, apostatizing from the Christian religion and being active crypto-Jews.

Emigration

Jewish "New Christian" emigration

Despite the discrimination and legal restrictions, many Jewish-origin New Christians found ways of circumventing these restrictions for emigration and settlement in the Iberian colonies of the New World by falsifying or buying "cleanliness of blood" documentation or attaining perjured affidavits attesting to untainted Old Christian pedigrees. The descendants of these, who could not return to Judaism, became the modern-day Christian-professing Sephardic Bnei Anusim of Latin America (it is only in the modern era that a nascent community, the Neo-Western Sephardim, is currently returning to Judaism from among this population).

Also as a result of the unceasing trials and persecutions by the Spanish and Portuguese Inquisition, other Jewish-origin New Christians opted to migrate out of the Iberian Peninsula in a continuous flow between the 1600s to 1800s towards Amsterdam, and also London, whereupon in their new tolerant environment of refuge outside the Iberian cultural sphere they eventually returned to Judaism. The descendants of these became the Spanish and Portuguese Jews (also known more ambiguously in the Netherlands as Spanish and Portuguese Jews, among other names elsewhere).

Muslim "New Christian" emigration
Although Iberian Muslims were protected in the treaty signed at the fall of Granada, and the New Christian descendants of former Muslims weren't expelled until over a century later, even so, in the meantime, different waves of Iberian Muslims and New Christians of Moorish origin left and settled across North Africa and the Ottoman Empire.

History of New Christian conversions

Spain
Throughout the Middle Ages, Sephardim (Iberian Jews) and Moors (Iberian Muslims) sometimes converted to Christianity, usually as the result of coercion: physical, economic, and social pressures.

In the 14th century, there was increasing pressure, especially against the Jews, that culminated in the riots of 1391 in Seville and other cities in which many Jews were massacred. These riots destroyed the Aljamas (Jewish quarters) of the cities and sparked many conversions, a trend that continued throughout the 15th century.

Portugal

Introductory Note by Professor António José Saraiva

The reading of this subject at a glance refers immediately to the understanding: "The only reality of the dichotomy between Old and New Christian only existed in the Inquisitorial taxonomy. The religious or ethnic definition of the new Christians was, in the last analysis, merely formal and bureaucratic. Also, the label of the New Christian can be based on rumors originating from dubious genealogies, slander, and intrigue. "In the book" Account of the Cruelties exercised by the inquisition in Portugal, 1708, "the author writes that" the New Christian label is based in mere presumptions, padded and swollen with inventions and lies. " The latter, being a book that does not identify the author is not properly accepted, but that of its analysis provides "logic" with descriptions that in their evaluation correspond, interconnect, hidden missing facts, in the form that the Inquisition reported the procedures.

Several Roman Emperors persecuted Christians as anti-Romanesque (see the story of St. Sebastian). In 313, Emperor Constantine was converted to Christianity and would become the official religion of the Empire. Jews existed in the Iberian Peninsula from before Christianity, brought in from Eastern provinces of the Roman Empire.

In 409, they invaded the Iberian Peninsula several barbarian tribes, Germanic Swabi, Vandals, Alans following the Visigoths that were allies of the Romans, establishing the Hispano-Visigothic Kingdom. The Visigothic Kings were Aryans. The First German-Roman Emperor would become Alaric II, who initiates persecutions to Jews, passing by the Council of Toledo in 633, and in the 6th council applies the "Placitum" that distinguished or guarded the converted Jews to Christianity, until the 6º degree of kinship or consanguinity until the invasion of the Moors in 711. The reconquest was then given and persecutions continued, modifying some characteristics until in the reign of John II (1425-1454) they would reach Peace. At the end of the fifteenth century, he would return to Spain.

Inquisition
The governments of Spain and Portugal created the Spanish Inquisition in 1478 and the Portuguese Inquisition, including the Goa Inquisition, in 1536 as a way of dealing with social tensions, supposedly justified by the need to fight heresy. Communities believed correctly that many New Christians were secretly practising their former religions to any extent possible, becoming crypto-Jews and crypto-Muslims.

See also
New Christian (disambiguation)
Converso
Crypto-Judaism
 Limpieza de sangre
Marrano
 Old Christian
 Sephardic Bnei Anusim
the Black Propaganda against Portugal and Spain

References

Further reading

 
 
Böhm, Günter. "Crypto-Jews and New Christians in Colonial Peru and Chile." In The Jews and the Expansion of Europe to the West, 1450-1800, edited by Paolo Bernardini and Norman Fiering, 203–212. New York: Berghahn Books, 2001.
Costigan, Lúcia Helena. Through Cracks in the Wall: Modern Inquisitions and New Christian Letrados in the Iberian Atlantic World. Leiden: Brill, 2010.

Novinsky, Anita. "A Historical Bias: The New Christian Collaboration with the Dutch Invaders of Brazil (17th Century)." In Proceedings of the 5th World Congress of Jewish Studies, II.141-154. Jerusalem: World Union of Jewish Studies, 1972.
Novinsky, Anita. "Some Theoretical Considerations about the New Christian Problem," in The Sepharadi and Oriental Jewish Heritage Studies, ed. Issachar Ben-Ami. Jerusalem: The Magnes Press, 1982

Pulido Serrano, Juan Ignacio. "Plural Identities: The Portuguese New Christians." Jewish History 25 (2011): 129–151.
Quiroz, Alfonso W. "The Expropriation of Portuguese New Christians in Spanish America, 1635-1649." Ibero-Amerikanisches Archiv 11 (1985): 407–465.
Rivkin, Ellis. "How Jewish Were the New Christians?," in Hispania Judaica: Studies on the History, Language, and Literature of the Jews in the Hispanic World, vol. 1: History, eds. Josep M. Solà-Solé, Samuel G. Armistead, and Joseph H. Silverman. Barcelona: Puvil-Editor, 1980.
Rowland, Robert. "New Christian, Marrano, Jew." In The Jews and the Expansion of Europe to the West, 1450-1800, edited by Paolo Bernardini and Norman Fiering, 125–148. New York: Berghahn Books, 2001.
Salomon, H.P. Portrait of a New Christian: Fernão Álvares Melo (1569-1632). Paris: Fundação Calouste Gulbenkian, 1982
Uchmany, Eva Alexandra. "The Participation of New Christians and Crypto-Jews in the Conquest, Colonization, and Trade of Spanish America, 1521-1660." In The Jews and the Expansion of Europe to the West, 1450-1800, edited by Paolo Bernardini and Norman Fiering, 186–202. New York: Berghahn Books, 2001.

External links
 Christians and Old Christians in Portugal, written by António Nunes Ribeiro Sanches, in 1748, in Portuguese
 A history of the Marranos, by Cecil Roth 
 Dramatic episodes of the Portuguese Inquisition, volume 1, by Antonio Baião, in Portuguese
 Dramatic episodes of the Portuguese Inquisition, volume 2, by Antonio Baião, in Portuguese
 Trial of Gabriel de Granada by the Inquisition in Mexico, 1642-1645, according to Cecil Roth, 'it gives a remarkably graphic impression of a typical Inquisitional case'
 A history of the Marranos, by Cecil Roth 

14th-century Christianity
15th-century Christianity
Crypto-Judaism
History of the conversos
Islam in Spain
Islam in Portugal
Jews and Judaism in Portugal
Jews and Judaism in Spain
Sephardi Jews topics
Spanish Inquisition
Latin American caste system
Spanish people of Jewish descent